Yegor Aleksandrovich Chernyshov (born 18 April 1997) is a Russian football player.

Club career
He made his debut for the main squad of FC Tom Tomsk in the Russian Cup game against FC Sibir Novosibirsk on 21 September 2016.

References

External links
 

1997 births
Living people
Russian footballers
FC Tom Tomsk players
Association football defenders